Diamandis or Diamantis (Διαμαντής) is a Greek surname. Notable people with the surname include:
Eleftherios Diamandis (born 1952), Cypriot biochemist
Georgios Diamantis, Greek shooter
Peter Diamandis (born 1961), Greek American engineer
Marina Diamandis (born 1985), Greek-Welsh singer better known as Marina and the Diamonds

Greek-language surnames
Surnames